Üksnurme is a village in Saku Parish, Harju County in northern Estonia.

Estonian strongman and entrant to the World's Strongest Man contest Andrus Murumets lives in Üksnurme.

References

Villages in Harju County